

Tsalka (Ćalḱis Municiṕaliťeťi;) is a municipality in Georgia's southern region of Kvemo Kartli, covering an area of . As of 2021 it had a population of 19,679 people. The city of Tsalka is its administrative centre. The area of the municipality corresponds to the historical region of Trialeti.

Administrative divisions
Tsalka municipality is administratively divided into 30 communities (თემი, temi) with 40 villages (სოფელი, sopeli), three urban-type settlements (დაბა, daba) and one city (ქალაკი, kalaki).

 city: Tsalka;
 daba: Bediani, Khramhesi and Trialeti.
 villages: for example Beshtasheni and Sameba.

Population

The population of Tsalka is 19,679 according to the 2021 estimate, which is a slight increase from the last census of 2014 (18,849). The ethnic composition is 46.7% Georgian, 38.8% Armenian, 7.0% Azerbaijani and 6.9% Greek. The population density is 18.7 people per square kilometer.

Politics
Tsalka Municipal Assembly (Georgian: წალკის საკრებულო) is the representative body in Tsalka Municipality, consisting of 30 members which are elected every four years. The last election was held in October 2021. Ilia Sabadze of Georgian Dream was reelected as mayor.

See also 
 List of municipalities in Georgia (country)

External links 

 Website Municipality

References 

Municipalities of Kvemo Kartli